Feynuus FC is a Somali football club based in Mogadishu, Somalia.

Honours
 Somalia Cup
Winner (1): 2010

Football clubs in Somalia